Bob Hearts Abishola (stylized as BOB ❤️ ABISHOLA) is an American sitcom television series created by Chuck Lorre, Eddie Gorodetsky, Al Higgins, and Gina Yashere that premiered on September 23, 2019, on CBS. It stars Billy Gardell and Folake Olowofoyeku as the respective title characters, with Christine Ebersole, Matt Jones, Maribeth Monroe, Shola Adewusi, Barry Shabaka Henley, Travis Wolfe Jr., Vernee Watson, Bayo Akinfemi, Anthony Okungbowa, Saidah Arrika Ekulona, and Yashere in supporting roles. In February 2021, the series was renewed for a third season, which premiered on September 20, 2021. In January 2022, the series was renewed for a fourth season, which premiered on September 19, 2022. In January 2023, the series was renewed for a fifth season.

Premise
Bob Wheeler runs his family's successful, highly-competitive sock company in Detroit with his mother Dottie and his younger twin siblings, Christina and Douglas. When the stress of the job lands Bob in Woodward Memorial Hospital, due to a mild heart attack, he is immediately drawn to Abishola Adebambo, his kind, hardworking Nigerian nurse. Despite their differences, Bob falls in love with Abishola and sets his sights on getting her to give him a chance.

Cast

Main
 Billy Gardell as Robert "Bob" Wheeler, a divorced man who runs MaxDot, his family's compression sock manufacturing company in Detroit.  When he has a heart attack because of the business and his family, he wakes at the hospital where he meets a Nigerian nurse and falls in love.
 Folake Olowofoyeku as Abishola Bolatito Doyinsola Oluwatoyin Wheeler (formerly Adebambo, née Odegbami), Bob's nurse at Woodward Memorial Hospital; an immigrant Nigerian who lives with her son, aunt and uncle in a small apartment. She and her husband emigrated to America with their son approximately eight years prior to season 2, but her husband returned to Nigeria after deciding he didn't want to start over in their new country.
 Christine Ebersole as Dorothy "Dottie" Wheeler, Bob, Douglas and Christina's mother. She and her late husband, Max, were the founders of MaxDot, named for them. After suffering a stroke, she moved in with Bob and receives nursing care from Abishola and Gloria at Bob's house.
 Matt Jones as Douglas Wheeler, Dottie's son, Bob's younger brother and Christina's twin brother. He is the vice president of human resources at MaxDot, a position he got purely through nepotism. (As Douglas alludes in season 4, "My greatest skill is having the last name Wheeler.") In season 2, Dottie demotes him to the warehouse floor, in an effort to teach him discipline and get him to take his job seriously. Despite initial objections, Douglas comes to enjoy his new job and especially likes the camaraderie with the warehouse workers, particularly Kofo and Goodwin.
 Maribeth Monroe as Christina Wheeler, Dottie's daughter, Bob's younger sister and Douglas' twin  sister. She is the head of sales at MaxDot and was previously married, but the relationship ended after she stabbed her husband with a knife. Frustrated with being unappreciated at work, she explores new career opportunities in season 3, eventually landing at one of MaxDot's competitors. After being fired from her new job in season 4, Christina returns to MaxDot as a janitor.
 Shola Adewusi as Oluwatoyin "Olu" Ifedayo Olatunji, Abishola's aunt and Tunde's wife
 Barry Shabaka Henley as Babatunde "Tunde" Olatunji, Abishola's uncle and Olu's husband
 Travis Wolfe Jr. as Dele Babatunde Adebambo, teenage son of Abishola and her ex-husband, Tayo. He dreams of being a professional dancer against Abishola and Tayo's wishes.
 Vernee Watson-Johnson as Gloria Tyler, a charge nurse at Woodward Memorial Hospital and Abishola's co-worker. She studied to become a doctor, but just as she was about to start her residency at Detroit Memorial Hospital, the doors were closed to her. Because she had a family and needed a job, she ended up becoming a nurse.
 Gina Yashere as Kemi, Abishola's best friend for the last 20 years. She works in food service at Woodward Memorial Hospital.
 Bayo Akinfemi as Goodwin Aderibigbe Olayiwola, an employee at MaxDot and Kofo's cousin. They often speak to each other privately in Yoruba. In season 2, it is revealed that Goodwin was on a path toward becoming a professor of economics before leaving Nigeria. In season 3, it is revealed that Bob intends to make Goodwin his successor after he retires. Frustrated that Bob won't be retiring anytime soon, Goodwin briefly goes to work at Christina's company before Bob invites him back with a promotion to MaxDot president.
Anthony Okungbowa as Kofoworola "Kofo" Omogoriola Olanipekun, an employee at MaxDot and Goodwin's cousin. He is promoted to Christina's position after she suddenly quits in season 3. This angers Goodwin, as the position ranks higher than his own job as warehouse floor supervisor.
 Saidah Arrika Ekulona as Ebunoluwa (main season 4-present; recurring seasons 2-3), Abishola's mother and Olu's sister

Recurring
 Tony Tambi as Chukwuemeka Mborata (season 1-present), a pharmacist who was Abishola's suitor and now is Kemi's love interest
 Kimberly Scott as Ogechi Mborata (season 1-present), Chukwuemeka's smothering and manipulative mother
 Raymond Ma as Wati (seasons 1 and 3), MaxDot's sock supplier from China
 Conphidance as Pastor Balogun (seasons 1-2), the pastor at Abishola's church
 Vishesh Chachra as Dr. Sanjiv Chakraborty (seasons 1-2), an arrogant doctor who works at Woodward Memorial Hospital
 Nicole Sullivan as Lorraine Wheeler (season 1-2), Bob's ex-wife
 Dayo Ade as Tayo Adebambo (season 2-present), Dele's father and Abishola's Nigerian husband who finally grants her a divorce near the end of season 2
 Tori Danner as Morenike (season 2-present), Abishola's cousin staying in Dele's old room, which Olu and Tunde rented. She is studying to become a pharmacist, while trying to keep the secret that she's gay.
 Edy Ganem as Olivia (season 3), a bus driver and Douglas' girlfriend.

Guest
 Missi Pyle as Liz (season 1), Bob's online date
 Wendie Malick and Marilu Henner as Jen Davenport and Trish Dolan (season 1), Dottie's friends
 John Ratzenberger as Hank Sobieski (season 1), a fellow stroke survivor whom Dottie meets
 Leonard Roberts as Guy (season 1), Hank's caretaker
 Ryan Cartwright as David (season 2), a salesman at a jewelry store where Bob and Tunde go to buy an engagement ring
 Jack McGee and Susan Ruttan as Mr. and Mrs. Clark (season 2), a patient at the Woodward Memorial Hospital and his wife
 Joel Brooks as Arnie Goldfischer (season 2), Bob's lawyer
 Nene Nwoko as Tiwa (seasons 3-4), Goodwin's wife
 Briga Heelan as Marion Mitchell (season 3), a commercial director who is brought in to shoot a TV spot for MaxDot
 Cedric the Entertainer and Tichina Arnold as Calvin and Tina Butler (season 3), reprising their roles from The Neighborhood as they watch the MaxDot TV commercial
 Jonathan Adams as Pastor Falade (seasons 3-4), the new Pastor at Abishola's church who appears to take a romantic interest in Ebunoluwa
 Joel Murray as Max Wheeler (season 4), founder of MaxDot and Bob's deceased father whom he sees in a vision
 Adhir Kalyan as Jared (season 4), a Toesie Wosey employee and Christina's stalker

Episodes

Production

Development
On October 5, 2018, it was announced that CBS had given the production an early pilot order. The pilot was written by Chuck Lorre, who executive produced along with Eddie Gorodetsky, Al Higgins and Gina Yashere. Production companies involved with the pilot included Chuck Lorre Productions and Warner Bros. Television. On May 6, 2019, it was announced that the production had been given a series order. A day after that, it was announced that the series would premiere in the fall of 2019 and air on Mondays at 8:30 p.m. The series debuted on September 23, 2019. On October 22, 2019, it was announced that CBS had ordered an additional nine episodes of the series. On March 13, 2020, Warner Bros. Television announced that production was suspended due to the television impact of the COVID-19 pandemic. The shutdown left the last two intended episodes of the season unfilmed. On May 6, 2020, CBS renewed the series for a second season, which premiered on November 16, 2020. On February 17, 2021, CBS renewed the series for a third season which premiered on September 20, 2021. On January 24, 2022, CBS renewed the series for a fourth season which is premiered on September 19, 2022. On January 25, 2023, CBS renewed the series for a fifth season.

Casting
On December 17, 2018, it was announced that five co-leads, opposite Billy Gardell and Folake Olowofoyeku as the title characters, had been cast, including Christine Ebersole, Maribeth Monroe, Matt Jones, Shola Adewusi and Barry Shabaka Henley.

This is Gardell's second starring role in a CBS sitcom, after Mike & Molly, which ran from 2010 to 2016 and was also executive produced by Lorre; in addition, Gardell has a recurring role on Young Sheldon as Herschel Sparks, a neighbor of the title character. Matt Jones is an alum of fellow Lorre/CBS series Mom. On January 30, 2020, it was reported that Anthony Okungbowa and Bayo Akinfemi had been promoted to series regulars. On September 7, 2022, it was reported that Saidah Arrika Ekulona has been promoted to series regular in season 4

Filming
While taking place in Detroit, Bob Hearts Abishola is filmed at Warner Brothers Burbank Studios in Los Angeles. Several Detroit references are incorporated into the show's setting. For example, the fictional Woodward Memorial Hospital where Abishola works is a reference to Woodward Avenue, (Michigan Highway M-1), which is a main route running from Detroit to Pontiac and named for Augustus Woodward who planned and oversaw the redevelopment of the city of Detroit following a devastating fire in 1805. The Dele character attends Jamerson Middle School, a likely reference to the legendary Motown bass player James Jamerson. Also, the Abishola and Kemi characters ride to work on the 16 Dexter bus, which is a real bus line for the Detroit Department of Transportation (DDOT). Co-creator Lorre chose the location, in part, because of Detroit's rapidly growing immigrant population. While Detroit's U.S.-born inhabitants declined 5.3 percent between the 2010 census and 2014, the immigrant population rose by 12.7 percent. The cast and crew were originally going to do location filming in Lagos, Nigeria for some Season 3 episodes, but the COVID-19 pandemic made those plans untenable, so stories set in Lagos were filmed in southern California instead.

The show is filmed on a closed set without a studio audience due to COVID-19; a laugh track is added during post-production.

Release

Marketing
On May 15, 2019, CBS released the first official trailer for the series.

Broadcasting
Bob Hearts Abishola premiered in United States on CBS and Canada on CTV on September 23, 2019.

Reception

Critical response
The review aggregator website Rotten Tomatoes reported a 58% approval rating with an average rating of 6.75/10, based on 12 reviews. The website's critical consensus reads, "Groundbreaking, but unfortunately grating, Bob (Hearts) Abishola undermines its own progressive premise with underwhelming humor that relies too heavily on outdated stereotypes." Metacritic, which uses a weighted average, assigned a score of 57 out of 100 based on 10 critics, indicating "mixed or average reviews".

Accolades

Ratings

References

External links 
 
 

2010s American sitcoms
2020s American sitcoms
2010s American romantic comedy television series
2020s American romantic comedy television series
2019 American television series debuts
CBS original programming
English-language television shows
Television series by Warner Bros. Television Studios
Television series created by Chuck Lorre
Television shows set in Detroit
 Television shows set in Michigan
Fiction about interracial romance
Television productions suspended due to the COVID-19 pandemic